Hilda Clark (1872 – May 5, 1932) was an American model and actress, known as the basis for the character depicted in the early-20th-century Coca-Cola advertisement Drink Coca-Cola 5¢.

Early life
'Hilda Clark was born in Leavenworth, Kansas, to Lydia and Milton Edward Clark.

Career

As a young adult Clark moved east to Boston to become a popular music hall singer and actress.  However, Clark became famous as a model in 1895 when she became the first woman to be featured on a tin Coca-Cola tray.  Hilda Clark remained the advertising "face" of Coca-Cola until February 1903 when she married Frederick Stanton Flower in New York, taking the name Hilda Clark Flower.

Flower was a nephew of New York Governor Roswell P. Flower.  Clark had been an active socialite in Boston but retired from the stage when she married.  Frederick Flower was a millionaire, involved in banking concerns and director of several railroads. Flower died in December 1930.

Death
Hilda Clark died on May 5, 1932, in Miami Beach, Florida. She was buried at Brookside Cemetery, Watertown, New York.

Bibliography
Pendergrast, Mark. For God, Country & Coca-Cola: The Definitive History of the Great American Soft Drink and the Company That Makes It. New York: Basic Books, 2000.

External links
Business Week - Hilda Clark

People from Leavenworth, Kansas
Coca-Cola people
Female models from Kansas
1872 births
1932 deaths